The 2009–10 KFC Twenty20 Big Bash is the fifth season of the KFC Twenty20 Big Bash, the official Twenty20 domestic cricket competition in Australia. Six teams representing six states in Australia are participating in the competition. The competition began on 28 December 2009 when the Queensland Bulls played the Victorian Bushrangers at the Brisbane Cricket Ground (Gabba).

This season comprised 15 regular matches, a preliminary final and a final, the same as it was in the 2008–09 season.

Table

Teams received 2 points for a win, 1 for a tie or no result, and 0 for a loss. At the end of the regular matches the teams ranked two and three play each other in the preliminary final at the home venue of the team ranked two. The winner of the preliminary final earns the right to play the first placed team in the final at the home venue of the first placed team.  In the event of several teams finishing with the same number of points, standings are determined by most wins, then net run rate (NRR).

The two teams that made the final qualified for the 2010 Champions League Twenty20.

Teams

Fixtures

Round 1

Round 2

Round 3

Round 4

Round 5

Knockout stage

Preliminary final

Final

Statistics

Highest team totals
The following table lists the six highest team scores during this season.

Last Updated 23 January 2010.

Most runs
The top five highest run scorers (total runs) in the season are included in this table.

Last Updated 23 January 2010.

Highest scores
This table contains the top five highest scores of the season made by a batsman in a single innings.

Last Updated 23 January 2010.

Most wickets
The following table contains the five leading wicket-takers of the season.

Last Updated 23 January 2010.

Best bowling figures
This table lists the top five players with the best bowling figures in the season.

Last Updated 23 January 2010.

Media coverage

Television

Fox Sports (live) – Australia
Star Cricket (live) – India, Sri Lanka, Pakistan
Sky Sports (live) – United Kingdom and Ireland
SKY Sport (live) – New Zealand
Supersport (live) – South Africa

References

External links
Tournament Page – Cricket Australia
Tournament Page – Cricinfo

KFC Twenty20 Big Bash seasons
Domestic cricket competitions in 2009–10
KFC